The Sony α3000 (model ILCE-3000) is a DSLR-styled mirrorless camera announced by Sony on 27 August 2013. Sony α3000 comes with a newly developed APS-C Exmor sensor, ISO ranges touches 100–16000, Full HD at 60 fps. This was the first camera introduced in Sony's newly rebranded "ILCE" range.

In Australia, Mexico, Russia, Eastern Europe, the Middle East and Africa it was replaced in March 2014 with the Sony α3500, which is identical but sold with the cheaper Sony E 18-50mm F4-5.6 kit lens.

See also
List of Sony E-mount cameras

References

External links
http://www.dpreview.com/products/sony/slrs/sony_a3000

Live-preview digital cameras
Cameras introduced in 2013
α3000